Annapurna Temple, Titagarh, is a Hindu navaratna (nine-pinnacled) heritage temple situated on the bank of the Ganges at Rasmani ghat at Titagarh, Barrackpore in North 24 Paragana. The temple is similar to the Bhavatarini temple at Dakshineswar.

History
Annapurna Temple was built on 12 April 1875, by Jagadamba Devi, youngest daughter of Rani Rashmoni. She was married to Mathur Mohan Biswas, who after the death of his first wife Karunamoyee, married Jagadamba Devi. Their son Dwarikanath Biswas made all the arrangements for the establishment of this temple. The temple was opened to devotees by Ramakrishna. Inside the temple complex there is a Natmandir, six Shiva temples and two Nahabatkhanas.

External links

References

1875 establishments in British India
Ramakrishna
Tourist attractions in North 24 Parganas district